Ytterbium(III) fluoride is an inorganic chemical compound that is insoluble in water. Like other Ytterbium compounds, it is a rather unremarkable white substance. Ytterbium fluoride has found a niche usage as a radio-opaque agent in the dental industry to aid in the identification of fillings under X-ray examination.

References

Fluorides
Lanthanide halides
Ytterbium compounds